Santhanam Arulsamy  சந்தானம் அருள்சாமி   (21 September 1959 – 6 January 2019) was a Sri Lankan politician and trade unionist. He was the Minister of Education and Hindu Cultural Affairs for the Central province in 2004. He was nominated  to Sri Lanka Parliament to replace Periyasamy Chandrasekaran  who had died from   Nuwara Eliya in 2010. He was the Senior Vice President of Ceylon Workers Congress.

References

Indian Tamil politicians of Sri Lanka
Indian Tamil trade unionists of Sri Lanka
Members of the 13th Parliament of Sri Lanka
Members of the Central Provincial Council
Up-Country People's Front politicians
1959 births
2019 deaths